Edward Morton may refer to:

Edward Morton (author) (1858–1922), British author
E. J. C. Morton (Edward John Chalmers Morton, 1856–1902), British barrister and Member of Parliament
Eddie Morton (1870–1938), American vaudeville singer and comedian